Grace Campbell (born 5 December 1995) is an Australian rules footballer with Collingwood in the AFL Women's competition (AFLW). Campbell made her AFLW debut in round 2 of the 2020 season.

State-league football
Campbell played football with the Bendigo Thunder in 2017, where she suffered a season-ending ACL injury. She made her return to football in 2019 after signing with 's state-league VFL Women's side. In 2019 she played 10 matches with the team and averaged 13.5 disposals and 8.1 tackles per game.

AFL Women's career

Richmond (2020)
Campbell was signed by Richmond's AFL Women's side as an Academy player in July 2019, ahead of the club's inaugural season in 2020.

In the pre-season training period, Campbell suffered a hip injury and failed to recover in time for selection for Richmond's inaugural AFLW match in round 1. She recovered in time to be available for round 2, where she was selected and made her AFLW debut.

North Melbourne (2021–S7 (2022))
Following the conclusion of the 2020 season, Campbell was traded to North Melbourne in exchange for a late third round draft selection. It was revealed she signed on with the club for one more season on 17 June 2021, tying her to the club until the end of 2022.

Collingwood (2023–)
In March 2023, Campbell joined Collingwood as part of a three-club trade.

Statistics
Statistics are correct to the end of the 2020 season.

|- style="background-color: #eaeaea"
! scope="row" style="text-align:center" | 2020
|style="text-align:center;"|
| 43 || 5 || 0 || 1 || 30 || 32 || 62 || 3 || 28 || 0.0 || 0.2 || 6.0 || 6.4 || 12.4 || 0.6 || 5.6
|- 
|- class="sortbottom"
! colspan=3| Career
! 5
! 0
! 1
! 30
! 32
! 62
! 3
! 28
! 0.0
! 0.2
! 6.0
! 6.4
! 12.4
! 0.6
! 5.6
|}

Personal life
Campbell is a keen keeper of goldfish. One is named 43. Campbell is trained as a registered nurse.

References

External links

 

1995 births
Living people
Australian rules footballers from Victoria (Australia)
Richmond Football Club (AFLW) players
North Melbourne Football Club (AFLW) players